Donaldson, Lufkin & Jenrette (DLJ) was a U.S. investment bank founded by William H. Donaldson, Richard Jenrette, and Dan Lufkin in 1959. Its businesses included securities underwriting; sales and trading; investment and merchant banking; financial advisory services; investment research; venture capital; correspondent brokerage services; online, interactive brokerage services; and asset management.

The firm was headquartered at 277 Park Avenue in New York, New York and employed about 11,300 when it was acquired in August 2000, by Credit Suisse for $11.5 billion.

History
Donaldson, Lufkin and Jenrette founded the firm on the principle that no one else on Wall Street was doing high quality independent corporate research.  They centered the firm around this notion and grew substantially. As research became more of a commodity throughout the 1980s and 1990s, they expanded into other businesses and grew dominant in high yield fixed income, or so-called, "junk bond" securities.  A major factor in DLJ's underwriting and trading success with these securities were the employees they had recruited from Drexel Burnham Lambert, during Drexel's decline in the late 1980s and its bankruptcy in 1990.

By 1997, the firm was ranked first in junk-bond underwriting (up from seventh in 1990).  DLJ, however, was not limited to junk-bonds.  From 1990 to 1997, it grew substantially in the stock underwriting business, rising from 20th to 4th highest volume in the United States. In the lucrative business of advising corporations in mergers and acquisitions, DLJ ranked seventh in 1997.

Though never considered a powerhouse investment bank like old-line Wall Street giants as Goldman Sachs and Morgan Stanley,  DLJ generated $3.49 billion in revenues with net income of $291 million in fiscal year 1996. This performance, in turn, pushed up the price of the stock of its majority owner, The Equitable.

According to Barron's, "In many ways, the Donaldson Lufkin & Jenrette saga is the classic tale of David beating Goliath." By all measures but one (junk bonds), DLJ had significantly less capital, offices and personnel than its competitors. Yet it was aggressive in acquiring new clients, doing deals and making money. DLJ was termed the "new Drexel."

DLJ's online brokerage business was first called the Personal Computer Financial Network (PCFN). It was renamed DLJDirect in 1997 and spun off from DLJ in 1999. Following DLJ's 2000 acquisition by Credit Suisse, DLJDirect was renamed CSFBDirect. CSFBDirect was renamed HarrisDirect after being sold to the Bank of Montreal in 2002 and was eventually re-sold to E-Trade in early 2006. The Pershing Division of DLJ (Harris) remained until being sold to the Bank of New York in 2003.

Credit Suisse's acquisition of DLJ closed in November 2000 with a purchase price of approximately $11.5 billion. Credit Suisse still uses the DLJ brand for its private equity operations, including DLJ Real Estate Capital Partners.  DLJ Investment Partners and DLJ Merchant Banking Partners both spun off as separate companies in 2013 and 2014 (respectively).

Both originally retained the 'DLJ' in their corporate names, with the merchant bank changing its name to aPriori Capital Partners in 2014.

Notable alumni
Barry B. Mione — CEO at SaveDay; Co-founder and Director of Investor Services at DLJdirect
Bruce Richards — CEO & Founder at Marathon Asset Management
Daniel Scotto 
David Einhorn — Founder and President of Greenlight Capital
Douglas Kahn — Former President/CEO of Croscill Home Fashions
Gideon Yu — President & Co-Owner of the San Francisco 49ers and former CFO of Facebook and YouTube
Hamilton E. James — American billionaire businessman, and the executive vice chairman of The Blackstone Group
Henry Jackson — Founder of OpCapita
Herald Ritch — Co-founder of Sagent Advisors
Joel J. Cohen — Co-founder of Sagent Advisors
Jamie Dinan — Founder and Chairman of York Capital Management, LP
James "Jimmy" Neissa — CEO/Head of North America at Rothschild & Co and former joint global head of investment banking at UBS
Ken Moelis — Former UBS Investment Bank executive and founder of Moelis & Company
Paul Singer — Founder and CEO of Elliott Management Corporation and The Paul E. Singer Foundation
Navid Mahmoodzadegan — Co-Founder and Co-President of Moelis & Company
Rich Riley — Senior Vice President & Managing Director of Yahoo! EMEA
Safra A. Catz — CEO of Oracle Corporation
Scott H. Aschoff — President & CEO of OCEANdrive Capital
Stephen A. Schwarzman — Chairman and CEO of the Blackstone Group
Susan Decker — Former president of Yahoo! Inc
William H. Donaldson — Former chairman of the U.S. Securities and Exchange Commission (SEC)
George Whipple III — lawyer and society reporter for NY1

See also

Credit Suisse
Credit Suisse First Boston
DLJ Merchant Banking Partners

References

Further reading

External links
DLJ prospectus
Interview with Richard Jenrette
DLJ profile on Google.com

Credit Suisse
Defunct financial services companies of the United States
American companies established in 1959
Financial services companies established in 1959
Financial services companies disestablished in 2001
Former investment banks of the United States
1959 establishments in New York City
2001 disestablishments in New York (state)
Richard Jenrette
1970s initial public offerings